Matthew Jackson Crowe (4 July 1932 – June 2017) was a Scottish professional footballer who played as a wing half. Active throughout Scotland, England and South Africa, Crowe made nearly 300 career appearances.

Career
Born in Bathgate, Crowe played for Bathgate Thistle, Bradford Park Avenue, Partick Thistle, Norwich City, Brentford and Port Elizabeth City.

Honours 
Brentford
 Football League Fourth Division: 1962–63
Individual

 Norwich City Hall of Fame

References

1932 births
2017 deaths
Scottish footballers
Bathgate Thistle F.C. players
Bradford (Park Avenue) A.F.C. players
Partick Thistle F.C. players
Norwich City F.C. players
Brentford F.C. players
Scottish Football League players
English Football League players
Association football wing halves
Scottish expatriate footballers
Expatriate soccer players in South Africa
Scottish expatriate sportspeople in South Africa
People from Bathgate
Footballers from West Lothian
Scottish Junior Football Association players
Scottish emigrants to South Africa
Port Elizabeth City F.C. players